Gertrude E. "Trudy" Pitts (August 10, 1932 – December 19, 2010) was an American soul jazz keyboardist from Philadelphia, Pennsylvania. She was known primarily for playing the Hammond B3 organ.

Biography
Trained as a musician and a music educator, Pitts studied at the Philadelphia Musical Academy, Temple University and Juilliard, as well as other institutions. Early work experience included a position as an assistant to the pianist in the Tony Award-winning musical Raisin.

At the end of the musical's tour, she was encouraged by her husband (who had worked with Shirley Scott as a drummer) to continue developing her repertoire.

In 1967, the Boston Globe printed a piece calling her a rising star and complimented her drawbar variation, vibrato shadings, and bass pedal work.

Trudy, and her husband, William Theodore Carney II, aka Mr. C. produced and performed at many festivals and venues together; such as The Mellon Jazz Festival Organ Jams (produced by Mr. C. and Trudy), the Mary Lou Williams Jazz Festival, San Jose Organ Festival, Cliveden Jazz Festival, West Oak Lane Jazz Festival. Together they produced the “Jazz in the Sanctuary” concerts which featured musicians such as Grover Washington, Jr., Etta James, Houston Person, Benny Golson, and Lionel Hampton.

Trudy Pitts eventually went on to play with Ben Webster, Gene Ammons, and Sonny Stitt. She recorded four albums for Prestige Records, appearing with Willis Jackson among others. In 1999, a compilation album of several records was released as Legends of Acid Jazz: Trudy Pitts With Pat Martino. Recent festival appearances include the 11th Annual Mary Lou Williams Women in Jazz Festival at the Kennedy Center in Washington, D.C., in May 2006. On September 15, 2006, Pitts was the first jazz artist to play a concert on Philadelphia's Kimmel Center's 7,000 pipe organ, "taking the medium to a whole new level".

In 2008, she again performed on an exceptional organ, this time the Kennedy Center's Filene Organ.

Trudy Pitts died on December 19, 2010, aged 78, from pancreatic cancer.

Discography

As leader

Singles
1962: Trudy Pitts & Mr. Carney: "I Really Mean It" // "Theme From Exodus" (Coral 62330)
1963: Trudy Pitts & Mr. Carney: "Meetin' Place" // "Swingin' Bonnie" (Coral 62347)
1967: "Steppin' In Minor" // "Take Five" (Prestige PR 45-448)
1968: "Bucket Full Of Soul" // "A Whiter Shade Of Pale" (Prestige PR 45-461)
1968: "Trudy 'N' Blue, Part 1" // "Trudy 'N' Blue, Part 2" (Prestige PR 45-705)

Albums
1967: Introducing the Fabulous Trudy Pitts (Prestige PR 7523) with Pat Martino and 'Mr. C'
1967: These Blues of Mine (Prestige PR 7538) with Pat Martino and 'Mr. C'
1968: A Bucketful of Soul (Prestige PR 7560) with Wilbert Longmire and 'Mr. C'
1968: The Excitement of Trudy Pitts (Recorded Live! At Club Baron) (Prestige PR 7583) with Wilbert Longmire and 'Mr. C'
1993: Me, Myself And I (Scorp Leo) solo piano album
1999: Legends Of Acid Jazz: Trudy Pitts With Pat Martino (Prestige 24208) (compilation of Introducing The Fabulous Trudy Pitts + These Blues Of Mine)
2007: Trudy Pitts Trio Featuring 'Mr. C' - Live At The Great American Music Hall (Doodlin' DR 005 [rel. 2009])

As sidewoman
With Pat Martino
 1967: El Hombre (Prestige PR 7513)
With Willis Jackson
 1968: Star Bag (Prestige PR 7571) with Bill Jennings
With Roland Kirk
 1976: Other Folks' Music (Atlantic SD 1686)
 1976: The Return of the 5000 Lb. Man (Warner Bros. BS 2918)
 1977: Kirkatron (Warner Bros. BS 2982)

References

External links

1932 births
2010 deaths
American jazz educators
Hard bop organists
Acid jazz organists
African-American jazz pianists
American jazz organists
Women organists
Coral Records artists
Musicians from Philadelphia
Temple University alumni
Juilliard School alumni
Prestige Records artists
Soul-jazz musicians
Deaths from pancreatic cancer
University of the Arts (Philadelphia) alumni
20th-century American pianists
Jazz musicians from Pennsylvania
20th-century American women pianists
Educators from Pennsylvania
American women music educators
African-American women musicians
20th-century African-American women
20th-century African-American musicians
21st-century African-American people
21st-century African-American women